Xu Lili (born 1 February 1981) is a Chinese  power lifter. She is a two-time silver medalist at the Summer Paralympics and has been world champion in the women's up-to-73kg competition.

Life
She was born in Chifeng in 1981. Like her fellow athlete Song Lingling her disability in her legs is due to polio. While she was working at a factory in 2009 she was spotted and asked if she would like to be an athlete. Li Weipu became her coach and she made her international debut in the following year at the World Championships in Kuala Lumpur where she made the final in the below 75kg category.
Xu also competed in the 2015 IPC Powerlifting Asian Open Championships where she took silver and at the 2016 Summer Paralympics in Rio.

She won the silver medal in the women's 73 kg event at the 2020 Summer Paralympics held in Tokyo, Japan behind Mariana D'Andrea of Brazil. She had broken her own personal record by lifting 138kg. A few months later, she won the gold medal in her event at the 2021 World Para Powerlifting Championships held in Tbilisi, Georgia. With this result she was again world champion in the women's up-to-73kg competition.

References

External links
 

1981 births
Living people
Chinese powerlifters
Female powerlifters
Paralympic powerlifters of China
Paralympic silver medalists for China
Paralympic medalists in powerlifting
Powerlifters at the 2016 Summer Paralympics
Powerlifters at the 2020 Summer Paralympics
Medalists at the 2020 Summer Paralympics
21st-century Chinese women